Bundy Cup  may refer to:

 Bundaberg Red Cup, a rugby league football competition in New South Wales, Australia
 Bundy Gold Cup, a rugby league football competition in Queensland, Australia now known as the Queensland Cup